Ayilo, also known as ayilor, hyile, and ferinkasa, is a Ghanaian term for bentonite clay. It is a baked solid white clay usually taken by pregnant women. They are usually baked into egg-shaped balls. Ewes call it agatawoe/agatawe, Gas called it ayilo, English call it kaolin and the Akans call it shirew/shile.

Location 
Ayilo is mostly made in Anfoega in the Volta Region of Ghana.

Uses 
Ayilo is claimed to manage nausea and to prevent diarrhoea, discomfort, and other pregnancy-related conditions. It is also used as a beauty enhancement. It also used for irritable bowel syndrome and for traditional medicinal purposes.

Effects 
When consumed too much by pregnant women might lead to anaemia. Chemical elements such as arsenic, boron, aluminium, and nickel found in Ayilo might harm individuals who consume it. It also causes constipation and addiction.

Other countries 
Ayilo is known as mabele in Democratic Republic of the Congo and in Cameroon as calaba.

References 

Ghanaian cuisine
Bentonite
Medicinal clay